Bozoğlak can refer to:

 Bozoğlak, Baskil
 Bozoğlak, Kastamonu
 Bozoğlak, Kemah